The 1976 Thunderbird Classic, also known by its sponsored name Talley Industries Phoenix Thunderbird Women's Tournament,  was a women's singles tennis tournament played on outdoor hard courts at the Arizona Biltmore Hotel in Phoenix, Arizona in the United States. The event was part of the 1976 WTA Tour. It was the sixth edition of the tournament and was held from October 4 through October 10, 1976. First-seeded Chris Evert won the singles title and earned $14,000 first-prize money.

Finals

Singles
 Chris Evert defeated  Dianne Fromholtz 6–1, 7–5

Doubles
 Billie Jean King /  Betty Stöve defeated  Linky Boshoff /  Ilana Kloss 6–2, 6–1

Prize money

References

Thunderbird Classic
Thunderbird Classic
Thunderbird Classic
Thunderbird Classic
Tennis tournaments in Arizona